is a 1999 Japanese mystery novel written by Kei Ii. An anime television series adaptation by Liden Films aired between April and June 2020.

Setting
The novel is set in the Meiji era, and follows fictionalized versions of the poet Takuboku Ishikawa and the linguist Kyōsuke Kindaichi. Ishikawa is a private investigator. They both investigate a supposed ghost haunting at the Ryōunkaku skyscraper.

Characters

Media

Novel

Anime
An anime television series adaptation was announced on March 22, 2019.  The series is animated by Liden Films, with Tomoe Makino serving as director and Shinpei Ezaki serving as chief director. Taku Kishimoto handled series composition, Shuichi Hara designed the characters, and MONACA composed the series' music. Muse Communication licensed the series in Southeast Asia and aired it on Animax Asia and later streamed on Muse Asia YouTube channel. It aired between April 13 and June 29, 2020, on Tokyo MX, BS Fuji, and CS Family Gekijo.  Makoto Furukawa will perform the series' opening theme song "Honjitsu mo Makoto ni Seiten Nari", while NOW ON AIR will perform the series' ending theme song "Gondola no Uta".

References

External links
 

1999 Japanese novels
Anime based on novels
Crunchyroll anime
Historical anime and manga
Japanese mystery novels
Liden Films
Muse Communication
Mystery anime and manga
Novels set in the Meiji period
Tokyo MX original programming